Dethloff is a surname. The name origins from North German and comes from A Personal Name Composed Of The Ancient Germanic Elements Theod ‘People Race’ + Wolf ‘Wolf’. The family has since its origin spread across europe and the world, and is now mainly found in the United States, Germany and Norway.  

Notable people with the surname include:

Frants Heinrich Dethloff ( 26. February 1829 (Oslo, Norway) - 1894 (Oslo, Norway) ) Father: Ludvig Heinrich Elias Dethloff  Mother: Hanna Charlotte Dethloff. Wife to Johanne Andrea Mathilde Dethloff. Merchant with stores across Christiania (Oslo).
 Carl Joachim Hinstorff Dethloff ( 2. Juni 1811 in (Brüel, Germany) -  † 10. August 1882 in Wismar), founder of the Hinstorff Verlag, an international publishing company. .
 Claus Dethloff ( Born 1968 ), German hammer thrower
 Elise Dethloff ( 1872 – 1931 ) (Born Stoltz), Norwegian physician
 Hans Gottfried Dethloff ( 18.5.1871 – 15.1.1948 ), Norwegian ophthalmologist (Royal Frederick University, 1897 with the cand.med. degree) and Knight of the First Class decorated by the  Order of St. Olav.
Henrik Dethloff ( 1867 – 1925 ), Famous Norwegian philatelist who received the Crawford Medal from the Royal Philatelic Society London in 1925 for his work Postage Stamps of Norway, 1855-1924.
 Henry C. Dethloff ( 1934 – 2019 ), American academic, historian, and writer
 Jürgen Dethloff ( 1924 – 2002 ), German inventor of chip card widely used in debit and credit-cards, received in 1997 the  Rudolf-Diesel-Medaille (Rudolf-Diesel Medal) which is awarded to outstanding inventors. 
Finn Hroar Dethloff ( Born 1932 ), Norwegian Civil Engineer (Thermodynamics from the Karlsruhe Institute of Technology), decorated for his contribution for the Norwegian petroleum industry. 
 Christian Finn Dethloff ( Born 1964 ), Norwegian Civil Engineer (Chemical Engineer from the Karlsruhe Institute of Technology ) and businessman.